Edward Lombe (born ?1800 – died 1 March 1852) was a Member of Parliament for Arundel from 1826 to 1830.

References

1800 births
1852 deaths
UK MPs 1826–1830
Members of the Parliament of the United Kingdom for English constituencies